Bruce Ricker (October 10, 1942 – May 13, 2011) was a jazz and blues documentarian. He is best known for his collaboration with Clint Eastwood on films about jazz and blues legends.

Life and career
Ricker was born on Staten Island, Ricker was educated at the City College of New York where he earned a bachelor's degree in American Studies. He earned a law degree from Brooklyn Law School in 1970.

His first film was the critically acclaimed The Last of the Blue Devils, a 1979 feature-length documentary about Kansas City jazz during its heyday in the 1930s and 1940s.

Eastwood was the executive producer for Thelonious Monk: Straight, No Chaser, a 1988 documentary produced by Ricker and Charlotte Zwerin, who also directed.

Ricker developed the idea for the Eastwood-directed "Piano Blues" segment of The Blues, the seven-part 2003 series executive produced by Martin Scorsese.

Eastwood served as a producer or executive producer on documentaries Ricker made for television: Budd Boetticher: A Man Can Do That (2005), Tony Bennett: The Music Never Ends (2007), Johnny Mercer: The Dream's on Me (2009) and Dave Brubeck: In His Own Sweet Way (2010).

Ricker also directed and produced the 1997 TV documentary Eastwood After Hours: Live at Carnegie Hall and Clint Eastwood: Out of the Shadows, a documentary that aired on PBS' American Masters series in 2000.

He died in 2011 at the age of 68 in Cambridge, Massachusetts.

References

1942 births
2011 deaths
American documentary filmmakers
City College of New York alumni
Brooklyn Law School alumni
Filmmakers from New York (state)
People from Staten Island